Günter Havenstein (14 December 1928 – 9 February 2008) was a German long-distance runner. He competed in the marathon at the 1960 Summer Olympics.

References

External links
 

1928 births
2008 deaths
People from Stargard County
Sportspeople from West Pomeranian Voivodeship
Athletes (track and field) at the 1960 Summer Olympics
German male long-distance runners
German male marathon runners
Olympic athletes of the United Team of Germany
Olympic male marathon runners
20th-century German people
21st-century German people